Hale and Pace were an English comedy double-act that performed in clubs and on radio and television in the United Kingdom in the 1980s and 1990s. The duo was made up of Gareth Hale and Norman Pace, with the Hale and Pace television show running for ten years and 66 episodes, from 1988 to 1998.

Early career 
Gareth Hale (born 15 January 1953) and Norman Pace (born 17 February 1953) met at Avery Hill teacher-training college in Eltham, South-East London. After five years in education, they moved to entertainment in the late 1970s. They performed mostly in the Tramshed in Woolwich, London for seven years. This developed into sketch-writing, with a show entitled Don't Stop Now - It's Fundation. Before appearing on TV, they did a series of radio shows for Radio 4 based on their show at the Tramshed. Their early TV breaks came on The Entertainers (1984) and Pushing Up Daisies (1984), and they went on to appear in the Channel 4 sketch show Coming Next (1985) and Saturday Gang (1986). They also appeared in The Young Ones three times, in the episodes "Flood", "Nasty" and "Time".

London Weekend Television show 

After a one-off special for London Weekend Television at Christmas 1986, they were given a full series in 1988. The first series won the Silver Rose of Montreux, as well as the Press prize. Their ITV series ran for a decade, with most of the programmes going out around 10 pm on a Sunday. The show is a mixture of sketches and stand-up. The series was also notable for its amount of musical numbers with every episode featuring at least one original song performed by Hale and/or Pace.

Their most famous comic creations are the stone-faced bouncers The Two Rons (not to be confused with The Two Ronnies), who are also known as The Management and for using the phrase 'I do, Ron, Ron' in their stilted conversations in a reference to the song "Da Doo Ron Ron" by The Crystals. The Two Rons' studio sketches either take place on some dimly-lit stairs next to the bouncers' venue or above Hale and Pace, where they have been keeping an eye on proceedings. In later series, The Two Rons are filmed on-location with Ron & Ron's Gardening Tips having the duo dispense thuggish wisdom about plants and flowers.

Hale and Pace are also famous for their ever-smiling and colourfully-dressed children's TV presenters Billy (Hale) and Johnny (Pace), and rockers Jed and Dave. Billy and Johnny started off in a number of sketches spoofing the kind of television programming which helps pre-schoolers learn, with Ainsley Harriott appearing in a number of the sketches as their co-presenter Willy.

Most sketches includes both Hale and Pace, though the black and white sketches featuring 1960s Beat Generation-era poet Groovy Wordbender are performed by Gareth Hale, whilst series one has a running gag featuring Norman Pace and a cow.

A number of their TV sketches caused controversy, especially the one in which they pretended to have microwaved a cat.

A number of writers worked on the series over the ten series, with a high number of writing duos contributing ideas for sketches including Carson & Tomlinson (script advisors Sean Carson and David Tomlinson), Nice & Smith and Hale & Pace themselves.

In March 2022, the series was acquired by That's TV for its comedy line-up which also included repeats of The Mrs Merton Show and Monty Python's Flying Circus.

Series list

Spin-offs 

Hale & Pace's characters "The Two Rons – also known as The Management" also had a spin-off series of their own called The Management which included a number of their regular cast in permanent positions and ran for a total of 6 episodes.  This series was also released on video but strangely only 4 out of the 6 episodes.  They also made several specials, such as the 1996 Showcase Hale & Pace Down Under from Australia and April Fools' Day.

Guest stars 

In early series, Hale and Pace would feature little known performers such as Ainsley Harriott, Annette Badland and Caroline Quentin, who would become successful in their own right later in the 1990s, but would not have any famous for the time stars in the series. Once Hale and Pace became more well known, more widely known stars appeared in their shows, with the snooker players Steve Davis and Jimmy White playing foil to the two cabbies in one episode.

DVD box sets 

All 10 series are now released on DVD, available in region 4 from Australia (No special features or extras, simple DVD transfer)
 Series 1 & 2  Alternative?
 Series 3 & 4 Alternative?
 Series 5 & 6
 Series 7 & 8
 Series 9 & 10

The show is rated  M  in Australia and  R16  in New Zealand for its sexual references.

The complete first series doubled with the 1986 Christmas Special was released in a 2 disc DVD set in the UK on 12 March 2012 by Network. It was classified "12" by the BBFC.

"The Stonk" 
In 1991 Hale & Pace were part of a charity supergroup, who released a single in aid of Comic Relief. Credited to Hale & Pace and the Stonkers, the record, called "The Stonk", was based on a fictitious dance craze and was co-written by the two comedians along with Joe Griffiths. The single was produced by Queen guitarist Brian May, who was also featured on the track and had his name printed on the front cover. Other musicians performing on the single, besides Brian May playing keyboards and guitar, were Nick Lowe, David Gilmour and Tony Iommi on guitar, with Neil Murray on bass guitar. Cozy Powell, Roger Taylor and Rowan Atkinson – appearing as his character Mr. Bean – performed on drums. Joe Griffiths and Mike Moran contributed on keyboard.

Comedians Steve Punt, Hugh Dennis, Rob Newman and David Baddiel appear in the video.

A UK number-one single for one week in March 1991, it was the UK's 22nd-best-selling single of the year. "The Stonk" was released as a joint-single with a track written and performed by the comedian Victoria Wood. Entitled "The Smile Song", the song was credited on the front of the single cover and listed as track 2 on the seven-inch and CD single (rather than B-side). However, the UK singles chart compilers (now the Official Charts Company) did not credit her with having number one hit, in a situation similar to the fate of Big Audio Dynamite II's "Rush", the AA-side of preceding number one, "Should I Stay or Should I Go" by The Clash.

Charts

Weekly charts

Year-end charts

Other appearances 
As well as their 1991 single "The Stonk", the duo also appeared as their characters "The Two Rons" in a firework safety campaign run around Guy Fawkes Night, in trailers that were run for several years in the late 1980s/early 1990s, in slots often directly after Children's BBC, but also occasionally during ITV commercial breaks.

Hale and Pace continued their charity work with a 1992 stint as spokespersons for the National Egg Awareness Campaign. They moved across to the BBC in 1997 and starred in the three-part series, Jobs for the Boys, a non-comedic show in which they took on a variety of employment challenges. One of these challenges was to write the UK entry for the Eurovision Song Contest.  They were advised/mentored by Rick Wakeman, Bruce Welch (from The Shadows - UK entry 1975), Lynsey de Paul (UK entry 1977), Pearl Carr & Teddy Johnson (UK entry 1959), Cheryl Baker (from Bucks Fizz - UK entry 1981), Lee Sheriden and Nicky Stevens (from Brotherhood of Man - UK entry 1976), Björn Again, former Eurovision presenter Katie Boyle, Johnny Logan, Katrina Leskanich (from Katrina and the Waves - UK entry 1997), songwriter Don Black (lyricist), and radio presenter Ken Bruce.

The duo also appeared, briefly, as shop-keepers Harvey and Len, in Part One of the 1989 Doctor Who story Survival. This gave them the distinction of appearing in what turned out to be the last ever story in the show's original 1963–89 run.

Their dramatisation of the Dalziel and Pascoe detectives for ITV in 1994 did not lead to success, and the BBC later attempted the serialisations with more success, with Warren Clarke and Colin Buchanan in the title roles.

In 1998, Hale and Pace could be seen in a BBC One programme called Oddbods, with the shows written by the duo in association with 
Richard Parker. Two episodes were aired.

A hybrid variety/comedy/quiz/people-show h&p@bbc was launched in 1999 under the watch of the BBC's Head of Entertainment Paul Jackson who had worked with the duo prior to his appointment. h&p@bbc was a 40-minute show, a mix of comedy, celebrity quizzes and audience participation. It was initially scheduled for Wednesday nights after the Nine o'Clock News. The h&p@bbc show was criticised by The Independents Brian Viner as being a throwback to low-budget quiz shows of the 1980s, and he considered the show's games to be a "derivative mish-mash".

Hale and Pace appeared working in a shoe shop in episode two of The Armando Iannucci Shows (2001). They appeared in the Christmas Special of the Gervais and Merchant show Extras, broadcast in December 2007. They appeared in several episodes of the 2018 season of Benidorm, playing a pair of financial fraud investigation officers.

Reception
The first episode of Hale and Pace's ITV television series won the 1989 Golden Rose of Montreux award.

Television critic Victor Lewis-Smith once described the duo by saying "Gareth Hale is the unfunny one with the moustache and Norman Pace is the unfunny one without the moustache".

References

External links 
 
 ClassicTelly.com Tributes to Hale and Pace
 Hale & Pace Facebook Page

1988 British television series debuts
1998 British television series endings
1980s British television sketch shows
1990s British television sketch shows
British comedy duos
Comic Relief singles
English comedy duos
English male comedians
ITV sketch shows
London Weekend Television shows
Television series by ITV Studios